Verdanus is a genus of true bugs belonging to the family Cicadellidae.

Taxonomy
The genus Verdanus was established by Oman (1949). The author distinguished Verdanus from the genus Diplocolenus on the base of aedeagal differences. Several authors considered it a subgenus of Diplocolenus. The genus Verdanus includes two subgenera, Verdanus and Erdianus.

Distribution and habitat
The species of this holarctic genus are mainly found in Eurasia and Northern America, especially in meadows of the mountain regions.

Species
Species within this genus include:
 Verdanus abdominalis  (Fabricius, 1803) 
 Verdanus bensoni China, 1933) 
 Verdanus caucasicus  (Emeljanov 1962) 
 Verdanus ciscaucasicus (Emeljanov, 1964
 Verdanus evansi (Ashmead, 1904) 
 Verdanus hardei  (Dlabola 1980) 80
 Verdanus intermedius  (Emeljanov 1964) 
 Verdanus limbatellus  (Zetterstedt 1828) 
 Verdanus logvinenkoae  (Emeljanov 1964) 
 Verdanus monticola  (Linnavuori 1958) 
 Verdanus nigricans  (Kirschbaum 1868) 
 Verdanus obenbergeri Dlabola 1945  
 Verdanus orientalis  (Ribaut 1936) 
 Verdanus oseticus (Emeljanov 1964) 
 Verdanus pazoukii Dlabola 1980  
 Verdanus penthopitta  (Walker 1851) 
 Verdanus quadrivirgatus  (Horvath 1884)

Description
These leafhoppers are pale green  with dark brown or black venter and legs. In Eridianus subgenus, aedeagus shows a basal apodeme strongly produced laterally, while connective have arms parallel distally and fused over part of length.

Biology
Adults are on wing from mid March to mid August.

References
Oman, P W - The Nearctic leafhoppers (Homoptera: Cicadellidae). A generic classification and check list in Memoirs of the Washington Entomological Society 3: 1-253. 1949

Cicadellidae
Hemiptera genera